Olhar (Portuguese for "Look") is the debut album by Brazilian band Metrô (not counting their self-titled album released as A Gota Suspensa in 1983), released in 1985 by Epic Records. A critically and commercially successful album, Olhar spawned numerous hit singles which were very popular at the time of their release and are still remembered to this day, such as "Tudo Pode Mudar", "Cenas Obscenas" (which counted with a guest appearance by Léo Jaime on guitar and backing vocals), "Johnny Love" (which was included in the soundtrack of Lael Rodrigues' 1985 film Rock Estrela, in which the whole line-up of Metrô cameod as themselves) and "Ti Ti Ti", used as the opening theme of the eponymous telenovela which ran from 1985 to 1986. A shorter version of their 1984 hit "Beat Acelerado" (subtitled "2nd Version") is also included.

The choirs in "Melodix" were provided by the new wave band Degradée, in which Metrô's guitarist Alec Haiat's brother Freddy played in. Guilherme Isnard of Zero provided backing vocals for "Tudo Pode Mudar".

"Hawaii–Bombay" is a Portuguese-language translation/cover of the eponymous song by Spanish band Mecano. The Portuguese lyrics were provided by Fernando Naporano, of Maria Angélica Não Mora Mais Aqui fame.

According to the album's liner notes, "Johnny Love" is a tribute to French musician Johnny Hallyday.

A special 30-year anniversary re-issue of the album, containing numerous bonus tracks, came out on August 5, 2016 (after one year of delay), through Warner Music Group.

Track listing

Personnel
 Virginie Boutaud – vocals
 Daniel "Dany" Roland – drums
 Xavier Leblanc – bass guitar
 Yann Laouenan – keyboards
 Alec Haiat – electric guitar
 Léo Jaime – electric guitar, backing vocals in "Cenas Obscenas"; electric guitar in "Johnny Love"; backing vocals and electric guitar in "Johnny Love (Alternate Version)"
 Degradée (Rogério Rego, Tom Marsh, Freddy Haiat, Salvador Rocca, Luiz Marcello) – choir in "Melodix"
 Guilherme Isnard – backing vocals in "Tudo Pode Mudar"
 Luiz Carlos Maluly – production

References

External links
 Olhar on Metrô's semi-official website

1985 debut albums
Portuguese-language albums
Epic Records albums
Metrô (band) albums